The Truth is a British rock band, active from 1982 to 1989. They reformed in 2012 for occasional live performances.

Biography
The group was formed by Dennis Greaves, formerly of Nine Below Zero, and Mick Lister in early 1982. They went through several line-up changes, but Greaves and Lister remained members throughout the group's run. They released several singles before their first album, Playground,  was issued in 1985.  The 1987 release Weapons of Love marked a stylistic change, and was their most commercially successful release in the United States. The title track was a hit single in the U.S., reaching No. 7 on the rock chart and No. 65 on the Billboard Hot 100. Several songs from the album were also used in the 1987 cult sci-fi film The Hidden. After 1989's Jump, they disbanded.

In 2012, Greaves reformed The Truth and played at London's Borderline on 26 October 2012.  The line-up is the original 1983 line-up of Dennis Greaves, Mick Lister, Chris Skornia and Brian Bethell, with Steve Phypers.

Members

Current line-up 

Dennis Greaves - guitar, vocals
Mick Lister - guitar, vocals
Tom Monks - keyboards, vocals
Anthony Harty - bass, vocals
Sonny Greaves - drums

Former members 

Chris Skornia - keyboards, vocals
Russell McKenzie - bass
Brian Bethell - bass (later Blow Monkeys member)
Richard Parfitt - bass (later 60 Ft. Dolls and solo)
Gary Wallis - drums
Rowan Jackson - drums
Allan Fielder - drums
Dennis Smith - bass
Steve Phypers - drums

Discography

Albums
Playground (Infinity Records, 1985)
Weapons of Love (I.R.S. Records, 1987) - US No. 115
Jump (I.R.S., 1989)

EP
Five Live (I.R.S. Records, 1984) - UK #97

Singles

Compilation
A Step in the Right Direction - Singles ● Demos ● BBC Live ● 1983-1984 (Cherry Red Records, 3 × CD, 2016)

References

English rock music groups
English new wave musical groups
Musical groups established in 1982
Musical groups disestablished in 1989
Musical groups reestablished in 2012
1982 establishments in the United Kingdom